Orthosia was a town of ancient Caria, inhabited during Hellenistic, Roman, and Byzantine times. It was not far from Alabanda, on the left bank of the Maeander River, and apparently on or near a hill of the same name. Near this town the Rhodians gained a victory over the Carians. It was the seat of a bishop from an early date, and, while no longer a residential bishopric, it remains under the name Orthosias in Caria a titular see of the Roman Catholic Church.

Its site is located near Ortas in Asiatic Turkey.

References

Catholic titular sees in Asia
Populated places in ancient Caria
Former populated places in Turkey
Roman towns and cities in Turkey
Populated places of the Byzantine Empire
History of Aydın Province
Yenipazar District